Volume control can refer to:

 Volume controlled continuous mandatory ventilation
 Potentiometer, a feature on audio equipment for adjusting the sound level
 Remote control
 Universal remote

See also
 Volume and Control Model, in sociology